Cemitério Municipal de Santana (Municipal Cemetery of Santana), popularly known as Chora Menino (English: cry boy), is a cemetery located in the northeastern zone of São Paulo in the district of Santana, and is one of the oldest cemeteries in Brazil.

It was officially recognized as a cemetery in 1897 and has an area of 38,485m². The local Jewish community used the location as a cemetery until 1970 known as Cemitério Israelita de Santana.

The name Chora Menino comes from a local tale about a woman who is said to have lived in the region who threw abandoned newborn babies into the valley alongside the cemetery for vultures to eat.

The cemetery with an area of 41,000m² and already with more than 1000 graves, now his area is of 38,485m² with approximately 12,000 graves and 76 mausoleums.

The cemetery is located on Rua Nova dos Portugueses in the Imirim neighborhood.

References

External links
 

Santana
1897 establishments in Brazil